Events in the year 1905 in Spain.

Incumbents
Monarch: Alfonso XIII
President of the Government:
 until 27 January: Marcelo Azcárraga Palmero
 27 January-23 June: Raimundo Fernández Villaverde
 23 June-1 December: Eugenio Montero Ríos 
 starting 1 December: Segismundo Moret

Births

April 5 - Ramón Torrado. (d. 1990)

Date unknown
Enrique Truan, composer. (d. 1995)

References

 
Years of the 20th century in Spain
1900s in Spain
Spain
Spain